Church of la Asunción or Church of La Asunción may refer to:

Church of la Asunción (Albacete)
Church of la Asunción (Almansa)
Church of La Asunción (Brea de Tajo)
Church of la Asunción (Galapagar)
Church of la Asunción (Hellín)
Church of la Asunción (Letur)